Nick A. Greisen (born August 10, 1979) is a former American football linebacker. He was drafted by the New York Giants in the fifth round of the 2002 NFL Draft. He played college football at Wisconsin.

Greisen also played for the Jacksonville Jaguars, Baltimore Ravens and Denver Broncos. He is the younger brother of quarterback Chris Greisen and the cousin of offensive lineman Casey Rabach.

Early years
Greisen was born and raised in Sturgeon Bay, Wisconsin. He attended Sturgeon Bay High School, where he played running back, linebacker and punter on the football field. Greisen was a five-sport athlete his senior year of high school.

College career
Greisen played college football at Wisconsin after being offered a scholarship at a Badger camp before his senior year of high school. After playing as a backup his freshman and sophomore years, Greisen cracked the starting lineup as a junior and led the Big Ten in tackles. He also earned All-Big Ten honors after his junior season.  A team captain his senior year, he led the country in tackles and was first-team all-Big Ten.

Professional career

New York Giants
Greisen was drafted in the fifth round (152nd overall) by the New York Giants in the 2002 NFL Draft. He played mostly on special teams during his first two seasons, and also made his first start in December of his rookie season when Mike Barrow was injured. He also saw significant playing time at linebacker after injuries to Barrett Green in 2004 and 2005 opened a starting position.

Jacksonville Jaguars
On April 28, 2006, the Jacksonville Jaguars signed Greisen to a two-year contract. The move came after Greisen could not put a deal together with the Tennessee Titans and the Jaguars tried unsuccessfully to sign LaVar Arrington. During the 2006 season, he started ten games and recorded an interception. Greisen was released by the team during final preseason roster cuts in 2007.

Baltimore Ravens
On September 19, 2007, Greisen signed with the Baltimore Ravens after the team waived Dennis Haley.  On March 13, 2008, the Ravens re-signed him to a three-year, $4 million contract with a $1 million signing bonus. Greisen's defensive playing time sharply declined in the 2008 season, and the Ravens released him on March 13, 2009 in a move that saved the team $716,000 in salary cap space.

Denver Broncos
On April 28, 2009, Greisen signed a one-year contract with the Denver Broncos. He spent the season on injured reserve after sustaining a knee injury in training camp. He was resigned by the team on April 29, 2010. Greisen was waived by the team on August 12, 2010 when the team signed Johnny Williams.

Omaha Nighthawks
Greisen was signed by the Omaha Nighthawks of the United Football League on September 8, 2010. He spent the 2010 and 2011 seasons with the organization.

Personal life
Greisen appeared on ElimiDate during his playing career in New York.

Greisen is married, and obtained an MBA degree from Northwestern University after his playing career ended. With that MBA, he signed on with Pro Financial Services as a sports insurance specialist.

References

External links
Just Sports Stats
Jacksonville Jaguars bio

1979 births
Living people
Players of American football from Wisconsin
American football linebackers
Wisconsin Badgers football players
New York Giants players
Jacksonville Jaguars players
Baltimore Ravens players
Denver Broncos players
Omaha Nighthawks players
People from Sturgeon Bay, Wisconsin
Kellogg School of Management alumni